Pol Roger is a producer of champagne. The brand is still owned and run by the descendants of Pol Roger. Located in the town of Épernay in the Champagne region, the house annually produces around 110,000 cases of Champagne.

History 
Pol Roger was born on 24 December 1831, the son of a lawyer. Beginning as a wholesaler of wine, he started his own champagne house in 1849, with the first growths released in 1853. He received an imperial and royal warrant for the Austro-Hungarian court.

The owners of Pol Roger are members of the Primum Familiae Vini. Pol Roger holds the current Royal Warrant as purveyors of champagne to Queen Elizabeth II.

Champagnes 
The house's prestige label is the vintage Cuvée Sir Winston Churchill. Churchill was oft to repeat Napoleon's maxim on champagne: "In victory, deserve it. In defeat, need it!" They also release three non-vintage cuvées, the Pure Brut (no added sugar), Brut Réserve and Rich (sweet), as well as three other vintage wines, the Brut Vintage, Blanc de blancs and Rosé Vintage.

Pol Roger Brut Vintage is typically a blend of 40% Chardonnay and 60% Pinot noir, although this can vary.

Cuvée Sir Winston Churchill 
Pol Roger had been the favourite champagne of Sir Winston Churchill since 1908.  After Churchill's death in 1965, Pol Roger placed a black border around the labels of Brut NV shipped to the United Kingdom. Madame Odette Pol-Roger (née Odette Wallace (1911-2000), a grand-daughter of the francophile art-collector Sir Richard Wallace, 1st Baronet), whom Churchill had befriended at a party at the British Embassy in Paris in 1944, attended his funeral nearly 21 years later. In 1987, when the trees on Churchill's country retreat, Chartwell, were devastated by the Great Storm, the Pol-Roger family paid for much of the replanting. 

In 1984, Pol-Roger introduced the Pinot noir-dominant Cuvée Sir Winston Churchill. The first vintage of this cuvée (the one introduced in 1984) was the 1975, only released in magnum format. It has been followed by the 1979, 1982, 1985, 1986, 1988, 1990, 1993, 1995, 1996, 1998, 1999, 2000, 2002, 2004, 2006, 2008, 2009 and 2012 vintages. This cuvée is typically released around ten years after its vintage year.

Cuvée Sir Winston Churchill replaced the Pol Roger P.R. Reserve Speciale at the top of the range. Reserve Speciale was a 50% Chardonnay and 50% Pinot noir blend from 100% rated grand cru vineyards.  First released with the 1971 vintage, it continued to be produced alongside Cuvee Sir Winston Churchill until the 1988 vintage, when its production was terminated as Pol Roger felt no need to have two competing prestige cuvees.

See also
 List of Champagne houses

References

External links

 Official website
 Official UK website

1849 establishments in France
British Royal Warrant holders
Champagne producers
Food and drink companies established in 1849
Luxury brands
Primum Familiae Vini
Purveyors to the Imperial and Royal Court